Frode Jakobsen (21 December 1906 in Østre Jølby, Denmark – 15 June 1997 in Denmark), was a Danish writer and politician who is remembered for his contribution to Danish resistance activities during the German occupation of Denmark in the Second World War.

In 1941, Jakobsen formed Ringen or the Ring, a secret resistance organisation. In 1943, became one of the key members of the Danish Freedom Council which coordinated resistance activities against the Germans until Denmark was liberated.   

After the war he became a member of the Danish Social Democrats party until 1973.

In his book I Danmarks Frihedsråd, he recounts how he helped to bring several resistance organisations together to work towards Denmark's liberation.

References

Danish resistance members
1906 births
1997 deaths
Social Democrats (Denmark) politicians
People from Morsø Municipality